Sree Oorpazhachi Kavu is a prominent Hindu temple in the Edakkad grama panchayat, a grama panchayats in Kannur District of Kerala state in southern India.

Etymology
Sree Oorpazhachi Kavu (ooril pazhakiya eachil kavu or ooril pazhakiya achi kavu).  The name of this temple renders itself to two etymological interpretations.  The former meaning pazhakiya (ancient) kavu (grove) surrounded by Eachil (a herb) and the latter meaning pazhakiya (ancient) achi (mother goddess) kavu (grove).  Irrespective of what may be the more authentic interpretation for Oorpazachi Kavu, it is the presence of this temple at Edakkad that imparts historical significance to the area.

History

Legends of the deities
The Sree Oorpazhachi Kavu temple has three main deities namely, Bhagavathy, Sree Oorpazhachi Daivathar and Kiratha sunu (Vettakkorumakan) within the inner courtyard (naalambalam), lending itself the rare significance of Shaiva - Vaishnava - Shaktheya sanctums within a single temple enclave. Apart from this, a shrine of  Thondachan is present at the upper citadel (Mele Kottam). There are several legends associated with the temple at the deities.

Kali to Gauri
The deity of Bhagavathy represents Mother Goddess. The legend associated with the Bhagavathy at Sree Oorpazhachi Kavu is related to how Kali (the dark complexioned Goddess Parvathi) became Gauri (the fair complexioned Goddess parvathi).

Legend has it that once Lord Shiva repeatedly addressed Goddess Parvathi as Kali to an extent that she inferred it to be a taunt at her dark complexion. Feeling insulted, sad and angered she said, "Wounds from arrows can heal and axed trees can regrow during the rain but a heart broken by impolite words cannot be made".  After promising herself that she will rejoin her husband only after attaining a fair complexion, Goddess Parvathi departed her husband’s abode for Madhya adavi to perform penance. Standing single legged in between Shaabara trees, she performed hard meditative penance for a hundred years with the sole objective of attaining a fair complexion. Pleased with her penance, Lord Brahma granted her the colour of a lotus tendril (gaura varnam) and thenceforth became Gauri. It is to be remembered in this context that Sree Oorpazhachi Kavu till recent past was in possession of a nearby vast area of land called Malikaparambu (thought to be a corruption of the word Kalikaparambu or Kali’s land).

It is believed that performing swayamvara pushpanjali for the Bhagavathy brings about a good marital alliance.

Sree Oorpazhachi Daivathar
The deity of Sree Oorpazhachi Daivathar is Vaishnava amsham. There are two main  legends associated with Sree Oorpazhachi Daivathar.

The first legend associated with Sree Oorpazhachi Daivathar has it that, once Lord Vishnu happened to laugh harmlessly at his consort, Goddess Lakshmi. Unfortunately for him, she misinterpreted this to be an act of mockery aimed at her. Angered as she was, she cursed her husband, "May you lose your head and be handicapped thus". Lord Shiva and Brahma were worried at the new fate of Vishnu and approached Goddess Lakshmi requesting her to redeem Vishnu from the curse. Goddess Lakshmi replied, "Para Shakti (the mother equivalent to the holy trinity) itself is a feminine concept. Despite this, Kali (an amsha avathara of Para Shakti herself) was insulted by Lord Shiva and consequently was in a state of penance at Madhya adavi to attain fairer complexion (gaura varnam)!!. Thus even the trimurtis (holy trinity) have at times exceeded their idea of fun. So let my curse on Vishnu for insulting me (an act along the lines of what Shiva did to Kali as well) be a lesson for all. If you desire Vishnu to be redeemed from the curse, oh Lord Brahma,   you should first reward Kali with the object of her penance. The accursed Lord Vishnu should then approach the appeased Kali/Gauri for his redemption.  He will definitely attain it from her and will thenceforth be known as Sree oorpazhachi. He may then along with his friend  (with Shaiva amsham), rule the lands (irunnum nadannum ooru vazcha nadatham) ". As per this advice, Lord Brahma granted Goddess Kali, the object of her penance (gaura varnam). Lord Vishu then reached Madhya adavi and pleased Goddess Kali/Gauri through his penance. A pleased Kali/Gauri not only granted him a redemption from his curse but also invited him and his friend (with Shaiva amsham)  to stay beside her in Madhya adavi as  guests forever. In course of time, the guest (Sree oorpazhachi) and his friend (with Shaiva amsham) attained greater significance in the temple than the Goddess herself. The Ketti adikkal (Oracle dance) of Sree Oorpazhachi seen all over North Malabar places Sree Oorpazhachi Kavu as its natal point.

The second legend deals with how Sree Oorpazhachi became Sree oorpazhachi Daivathar. Lord Kiratha sunu (Vettakkorumakan) was a great warrior but his self pride was a source of distress to the Gods. On a request from the Gods, Lord Vishu disguised himself as a hunter and engaged Vettakkorumakan in a duel with bow and arrows. During the duel Vettakkorumakan sensing a divinity in his opponent, asked, " Daivathil aar ?" To which he received the reply "Daivathar". In the course of the duel, in the spirit true to a great warrior, Vettakkorumakan became soon interested in a novel and additional weapon (Churika) that he observed in the waist band of his opponent Daivathar.  Sensing the desire, Daivathar put forth the condition that if he desired so, Vettakkorumakan may shift his bow and arrows to the left hand and take possession of the churika in the right under the condition that he will never place it down on the earth. Vettakkorumakan did so with great delight, but to his dismay, the churika began increasing in weight by minute. Troubled by this new development he went in for a truce and befriended Sree Oorpazhachi Daivathar abandoning his vane self-pride .

Lord Vettakkorumakan
The deity of Vettakkorumakan is Shaiva amsham. As per legend, in order to teach a lesson to Arjuna, who had become too proud of his abilities, Shiva and Parvathi go in disguise as tribal hunters to where he was doing penance (Tapas).  A boy is born to the couple during the hunting trip.  The boy becomes extremely naughty and disturbs the peace of the people including saints.  Based on their request, Mahavishnu also disguises as a hunter and humbles the boy, gives him a dagger (Churika) and, when eventually pleased, blesses him.  This son of Shiva was deified as Vettakorumakan.

Thondachan (Grand ancestor/temple custodian
The deity of Thondachan represents Kshetrapalan (temple custodian) and is believed to be the grand ancestor. The shrine of Thondachan is at the upper citadel (mele kottam). The offerings for him include, beetle leaves, arecaunut and dried rice. His idol is that of a bearded divinity with bow and arrow on his left hand and a churika in his right. His citadel serves as the site of performance for two forms of oracle dances namely Vellattom and Kaliyattom. The former representing Vaishnava and the latter representing Shaiva elements respectively. Thondachan is thus revered as Vishnu-Shiva in single form (as Guru and Vaidya (physician)).

Shaneeshwara Sankalpam (Saturn worship)
In addition  Melekottam is also the sanctum for the worship of Shani (Saturn).As per legend Sree Oorpazachi kavu has been a centre of worship of Shani. It is believed that Sree Rama after the Vala prathishta at Sree Peru Valasseri, also performed the Sankalpa Shani Prathishta (consecration of Lord saturn) at Sree Oorpazach kavu in order to mitigate the Shani Dosha (of himself and the parivarams) as he believed that the delay in Sree Hanumaan to reach with the idol of Lord Siva for prathishta at Sree Peruvalasseri was due to Shani kopa (anger of saturn). This legend states that Sree Rama visited the holy grove of Eachil and received the blessings of Sree Oorpazhachi Bhagavathy to redeem him of his Shani Dosha and facilitate the destruction of Ravana and his contingent of demons. Hence then mele kottam has also been considered as the place of worship of saturn. It is believed that attending the Vellattom and/or Kaliyattom (oracle dances) helps devotees to relieve their Shani Graha dosha (astrologically unfavourable Saturn). Shaneeswara (Lord Saturn) blesses and relieves the devotees of the shani graha doshas as they attend this ritual propitiating sun god through vellattom.

Legends of Vilwamangalam Swaamiyaar

It is generally believed from oral tradition that Vilwangalam Swaamiyaar visited Oorpazhachikavu. Lord Krishna in his infant form had chided the Swaamiyaar to meet again in the Ananthan forest. Consequently, the Swaamiyaar become a peripatetic devotee in search of Krishna and in one such journey had paused at a distance that was just 24 minutes (1 Naazhika) in walking range north of Oorpazhachi Kaavu, owing to an injury in his leg by a thorn. Due to the resultant overwhelming pain he rested there and was subsequently met by two Brahmin by-travellers. These by-travellers applied herbs to soothe the Swaamiyar's pain and advised him to rest in the nearby Oorpazhachi-Kaavu for the night. Around sunset when the exhausted Swaamiyaar reached the premises of Oorpazhachi-kavu, he was told that it was a Shivite temple. Owing to his oath that he will not partake food from any Shivite sanctuary, he bathed in the nearby pond and soon fell asleep on the banks of the pond due to the overwhelming exhaustion. Later that night two Brahmins came to the bank of the pond and invited him to Oorpazhachi-Kavu for food. When the Swaamiyaar informed them of his oath not to consume any food from Shivite sanctuaries, they informed him that Oorpazhachi Kavu is a Vaishnavite sanctuary. Although suspicious, the Swaamiyaar entered the temple and to his surprise envisioned in the sanctum sanctorum a divine persona with Shankhu-Chakra-Gadhaa-padmam, Chandra-kala and Ganga and a crown of peacock-feathers. After proper salutations of this surprising deity, the two Brahmins offered him food in the Thidapally (place where food is prepared to be offered to the deities) after which these Brahmins disappeared. The Swaamiyar was thus simply wonderstruck and impressed with the miraculous-illusion (Maaya) experienced by him in the premises of the deities of Oorpazhachi-Kavu. Next day, during morning ablutions the Swaamiyaar once again injured his leg, this time by striking a stone. Therefore, after the appropriate propitiation of the three deities at Oorpazhachi Kavu, the Swaamiyaar applied the Vilakkilenna at the site of his injury and to his surprise was relieved of the pain immediately. Impressed by his experiences here, his faith in the deities of this Kavu manifold. Therefore, before continuing with his journey further, he dispersed "blessed-sand" (japicha manal) within the walled premises of the temple, inside the Manikkinar-well and the old-pond and stated that as long as these sand particles remain there, the fame, money and the curative properties of the Vilakkilenna will remain. Reminiscent of this, even today, one observes unique customary practices during sweeping or weeding of the walled premises of this temple, whence, the garbage is thrown out but the sand is never thrown out. In addition, the water of the Manikkinar-well which is usually kept closed with a wooden plank to prevent animals from falling and which has thereby limited exposure to sunlight and rain, still retains its purity and superior quality. A miracle attributed to the blessing of the Swaamiyaar.

Ooralars (hereditary trustees) and their origin
The term Oor means village and Ooraalan (Ooraalar, if joint partnership) means master (masters) or proprietor in these villages. The Sree Oorpazachi Kavu temple was the seat of such a socio-political body that enjoyed partial autonomy and administered the region. Nine prominent Nambiar families were Ooraalar and constituted the village and temple assembly that arbitrated local administration. They belonged to a further endogamous denomination among Nambiars called Randu Illam Vargam (As they derive their ancestry from Mullapalli Illom and Velloor Illom). As per legend two Nambudiri youths who were scions of Mullapalli and Velloor illoms respectively, visited the fort at Balussery. Before returning from the fort, the two youths married ladies from the family of two nayar chieftains (Kavullavan Nambiar and Vennapalan Kurup ) and brought them to Edakkad. They were settled in two separate residences at Kuliyambethu and Edupidikkeri. The area surrounding their residences were filled with eachil groves. After a while, when these ladies ventured into the eachil grove nearby, they observed milk and blood overflowing from detached eachil leaves, and immediately reported it to the Nambudiri youths.

The Nambudiri youths inferred  that it is an omen that the spirit of Vettakkorumakan (the presiding deity of Balussery fort) had accompanied their wives and required to be enshrined within the temple precincts.  The descendants of the two matrilineal stems of Kuliyambethu and Edupidikkeri, fathered by Mullapalli and Velloor illoms, later expanded into eight separate taravads formed an endogamous sub-clan (referred to as Randu illom vargam) and inherited the proprietership of the Oorpazhassi Kavu and desam (Ooraima) from Mullapalli and Velloor illoms as a danam (gift/grant). The danam (grant/gift ) was achandratarame santatipravesame (for the descendants as long as moon and stars last) showing the permanent, hereditary nature of the grant. Each taravad referred to a family tracing descent from a common ancestress and with mudal sambandham (relationship of property ) and pula sambandham (relationship of pollution). Since four taravads arose from Eduppidikkeri and the other four from Kuliyambethu, they formed two blocks with four sibling taravads in each block and considered their respective matrilineal stems (Kuliyambethu and Edupidikkeri) as their gotra. In essence, each block represented a wider matrilineal kin group that was knit by symbolic ties prominently in sharing birth and death pollution and a memory of common ancestor. Marriages within taravads of the same block are prohibited. In later years it was observed that  at any given time if a death or birth occurs simultaneously in either blocks, the temple administration was jeopardized as none of the eight Ooralars were not able to officiate the temple proceedings. The predicament was presented to the then Raja of Chirakkal (Kolathiri) who proposed the adoption of a ninth family into the ooralar conglomerate as a solution. As a result, the ninth family (namely Kolathattil) was adopted as equivalent to the original eight matrilineial lines and included in the endogamous sub-clan and thus now there are nine Ooralar families as under:-

The nine Ooralar families are as follows.

Vannarath
Thyngoli
Chettianbrath
Keethari
Kaappiath
Keloth
Thykandi
Paarayil
Kolathattil

Nambiar men of the Randu illom vargam were addressed as Family name + achan, Kaikkor (possibly equivalent to the south Kerala title Kaimal). The women were referred to as name + amma or family name + amma or as Moothamblakka.

After the Land Reforms Ordinance was enacted by Kerala State Government and the breaking of Janmi- kudiyan (feudal tenancy relationship) system Sree Oorpazhachi Kavu and the Ooralar families do not have any socio-political influence in the area.  However the eldest-male from these matrilineal families still perform their role as de facto Ooralar in the Sree Oorpazhachi Kavu temple administration during ceremonial events. One finds reference to this famous temple in the Malabar Manual by William Logan, the British collector of Malabar.

Jeevitham (Pension/Purse)
The jeevitham is the pension entitled to each Ooralan for officiating his dignity. It is a due in respect of his station and his sacrifices and proportionate to relative contributions of individual families in the past that he stands to represent.  In the very old past the expenditure of the temple was solely dependent on income from donation-box-revenue (Bhandara-pirivu) and offerings (Vazhipaadu) alone. There was no fixed source of stable income. Therefore, the then 9 ooralars donated most of their family lands in the name of their family deities as donation with the objective that this pool of property will generate a stable income for the temple. This pooled capital was the source of subsequent financial prosperity of our Kavu and lead to the Kavu using the profit from this initial donation to acquire more land and expand its income exponentially thereafter. In due memory of this sacrifice and respecting dignity of their station, when the income of the Kavu increased, a traditional pension scheme called jeevitham was permanently instituted for the Ooralars. The Jeevitham pension was in terms of measures of paddy called seer. The history of the Kavu has shown that they have always readjusted the nature of the original jeevitham-pension from time to time to suit the financial income of the temple. When the land reforms and land ceiling was introduced in Kerala and further loss of land to tenants resulted in drastic reduction of income, the Ooralars once again made a magnanimous sacrifice. They revised their jeevitham pension from huge measures of paddy to an obsolete and paltry rupee equivalent of it ( 1 and odd rupees !) and accepted that as a token due to their dignity. In recent times HR & CE and Malabar Devaswom board  revised the pay-scale of Malabar temple employees while  completely neglecting to revise the due Jeevitham-pension of Ooralars

Oorpazhachi Devaswom
The administration of Sree Oorpazhashi Kavu, the shrines attached thereto and all the properties movable and immovable are administered by the hereditary trustees constituted as  Board of Trustees. members of the Board of Trustees are the  senior-most males along the matrilineal line of the nine Nambiar lineage  of Randu illom Vargam.  The regulations in the modified scheme specified in OA No.14 of 1960 of the Hindu Religious and Charitable Endowments (HR & CE) Act is the basis of temple administration and the scheme reiterates that the ownership of the  movable and immovable property of the temple remains exclusively with the progeny of the trustees lineage. The elected Chairman of the Board of Trustees with assistance of the Executive Officer appointed by the Board of Trustees  manage the day-to-day activities of the temple.

Invasion of Malabar by Tipu Sultan and the temple
During Tippu Sultan's military exploits (Padayottam) in the 1790s, the temple administration (devaswom) to escape from the looting of temple, fled carrying the idols and  valuables and took refuge in a confidential sanctuary of Akkaraveettil Tharavad in Thalassery and was brought back and re-consecrated only after the withdrawal of Tippu sultan from Malabar. The Akkaraveetil family later donated their Thevarappura (worship house) to the devaswom as it had been used for housing the deities during the said invasion. Deivathaar madam at Tellicherry is the aforesaid 'thevarapura', which is under the ownership of Oorpazhachi Devaswam; however the ritualistic practices at Deivathar Madam  are conducted there by a local committee of devotees. Tipu, seemingly took  a route through the coastal plain much west of Madhyaadavi, converting the Namboodiris of Kizhunna padinjaar and Erinjikkal and this diversion of route  helped Oorpazhachi kaavu  and randillam vargam to retain their identity even today.

Re-construction of Oorpazhachi Kavu in the nineteenth century
Kappiath Chandu Nambiar undertook the reconstruction of the temple to the massive structure that we know of it as today during the period from 1845 to 1899. The cost of this half a century long re-construction process under his leadership was ~50,000 Rupees. The temple reconstruction was envisaged then because by the first quarter of the 19th century the annual income of the previously small Kavu had increased to an astonishing high of 1 lakh seer paddy (93,000 kg) and 4500 rupees in rent (paattam) in addition to devotee donations. Therefore, all the nine ooralars decided to expand the temple structure. Kappiath Chandu Nambiar was born in 1825 and died in 1906. He was popularly known among the masses as "Shakthan Kappeeshan". He was so reputed for his intelligence, administrative efficiency, popularity and political contacts that the other 8 Ooralars unanimously entrusted upon him the sole and complete rights to undertake the reconstruction of our temple. The sanctum sanctorums, the naalambalam, the Agra-shaala, the Koottappura, the wells, the bhajana-rooms, the magnificent new pond beneath the temple steps were all re-constructed under his command to the present form. The completion of this reconstruction was in 1899 corresponding to the Kollam Era 1074 on 14th of Edavam with Dwaja-prathishta .

The copper roofing of Mele-kottam was a donation of a Prince of Chirakkal Kovilagam for having been cured of a Prameha-kuru (diabetic sore/eruption) after offering prayers at Mele-kottam. Apart from the copper roofing of Mele-kottam, this prince also invested an annual contribution of 101 Nazhi rice (for paayasam) regularly during Thriputheri festival. This contribution has become extinct. Late Keezhattil Raman Nambiar (The assistant surgeon who died in 1922) added to the magnificence of our temple by contributing the five-tiered Deepasthambams (Huge bronze Lamp).

Worship and festivities

Pooja (worship) and Tantra (esoteric rituals)
The daily pooja (worship) is done by brahmins (of the house Chandra Mana) whereas the rights to Tantra are retained with Mullapalli and Velloor illoms.
Abhishekam (holy bath)
Usha pooja (morning worship)
Uchcha Pooja (mid day worship)
Sankunatham (sounding the conch)
Deeparaadhana (worship with lamps)
Athaazha Pooja (last worship of the day)
(in all the three sree kovils)

Mandala Vilakku (holy 41 days from Mid November to end December)
Starting on Vrischika Sankramam
Ending on Dhanu Pathu
Importance of Appa nivedyam (rice cakes) for athazham (dinner)

Shivarathri Mahotsavam (The night in glory of Shiva)
Kodiyettam (flag hoisting)
Utsavam (festival)
Aarattu (holy procession)
Beginning of the festivities for the next year with aarattuthara Ezhnnellpuu in the night. (Though the Utsavam for the year comes to an end by aarattu in the midnoon and, the Ezhneellippu in the night of the aarattu day is a unique festivities performed very rarely in temples.)

Vellattom and Kaliyattom (ritualistic oracle dances)

Daily at mid-noon as vertical rays of the sun falls directly perpendicular on the sanctum sanctorum, the Daivatar Vellattom (ritualistic oracle dance) is performed.  A similar ritualistic oracle dance called  Vettakkorumakan  Kaliyattam is occasionally performed at mid-night.  These rituals are rarely seen in any other shrines or temples.

Guru Sankalpam
The kannimoola (prime corner) of the inner courtyard of the temple is known as koottappura (assembly room). This is the place where monthly kuri (socio-religious/economic/administrative convention) is convened.  The distribution of prasadam on auspicious occasions are distributed by the kaaranavrs at this place. This is believed to be the sacred spot where "Guru" has the sankalpa prathishta. Lamps are lighted in front of the koottappura in the morning and evening sandhyas.

Kuri
Monthly kuri is  a ceremonial function where the ooralars attend formally to discuss matters pertaining to the temple administration. This vestigeal custom from feudal times is an administrative ceremony where matters of  socio-religious and economical consequences for the oor or grama (village) under the patronage of ooralars, were discussed. By tradition, an ooralan who was absent for the previous meeting can attend the subsequent meeting only after being penalised for his earlier absence. The penalty normally is to stand at the entrance of the meeting area till such time as the absentee is invited to attend.

Pattathanam(Annual festival)
Pattathanam is a traditional annual festivity that extend for several days in the Malayalam month of Kumbham (Feb–Mar).  The festivities are held under the patronage of the Ooralar families, the temple devaswom and the people.  The festivities included performances of classical music, dances and other art forms.

Vettakkorumakan Paattu and Pantheeraayiram / Thengamuttum Pattu
The ritual of Vettakkorumakan Paattu (meaning "song in praise of the son born during a hunting trip") is performed to propitiate Vettakkorumakan.  This ritual is performed by either Nambudiris authorised for the purpose or the Karol Panicker/Nayar.  The deity worship is done either as the son of Kirathan or as his Vapuss (body), with a difference in the base hymns (apaadu – Nambudiris or Karol Panicker, in this case) carries the idol to the temple  and accompanied by the drumming and music with special lyrics.  The oracle now represents the deity and wears a red dress (Thattuduthu Pattuchutty) and red flower garland.  The oracle performs a peculiar dance with the accompaniment of drums.  This is called Eedum Koorum.  Having two specialist drummers (Maaraars) ensures correct method of drumming (Chenda rhythms similar to the one in Thayambaka or Thodayam in Kathakali).  Usually he completes at least two Eedu and three Kooru.
The specialist artist (Kallattu Kurup, a sub-caste) would have by then completed a large colourful picture of Vettakkorumakan with colour powders (white, yellow, red and green). The oracle then slowly steps around (Kalapradakshinam) this figure in special rhythms, completing at least seven rounds (representing seven Kundalini cycles) and then leaves the venue.  The Kurup sings a number of songs in praise of the God, after which the oracle returns, cuts the cordon around the figure with dagger, enters on to the figure and dances (Kalam Kaanuka).  Later he goes to the pond, bathes, returns, cuts the hanging decorative palm-leaves (symbolic of cutting the forest, removing the dirt in the mind) with the dagger and slowly and rhythmically erases the figure.  The final item is for the oracle to break unhusked coconut (Cocos nucifera) by throwing them on a stone slab.  Anywhere from three to twelve thousand coconuts may be broken continuously in a single sitting.  Again, symbolically, this is supposed to be a form of surrender of the mental propensities and is done for the purpose of eliminating all troubles and problems of the family.  The coconut represents head and the throw represents surrender. The fifty ganglias (controlling the fifty mental propensities) namely Moolaadhaaram (4), Swaadhistthaanam (6), Manipooram (10), Anaahatham (12), Visudhi (16), and Aajna (2), with each performing inside and outside the body, totally make up 100 instances.  These 100 instances when performed in the ten different specific directions make the total instances one thousand.  These thousand instances when performed in 12 difference zodiacs (Raasi) escalate the total figure to 12,000.  This performance is known as Pantheeraayiram (twelve thousand). Believing that these 12,000 coconuts carry the mental problems of worshipers, they usually donate coconuts for this purpose.

Thitambu Nritham (dance with the replica of the deity)
Thitambu Nritham is a dance form carrying the thitambu (replica of the deity) and is regulated by, rhythm (Thaalam) which is Layam.  Surprisingly, it has not been included among the temple arts of Kerala, though connoisseurs admit that this is an art, and a ritualistic one.  It is mainly performed only by select by Nambudiris or Embrandiris of north Kerala and is one of the special attractions of Sree oorpazhachi Kavu during pattathanam.  As the priestly dancer comes out carrying the replica of the idol on his head, the Maaraar (hereditary drummer in temples) makes the characteristic drumming when Tantric rites are performed.  The word Thitambu suggests the direct manifestation of the deity. Dancing with the replicas of the deities on ones heads, is a unique feature of north Kerala.  The origin of Thitambu Nritham cannot be easily traced.  Some opine that brahmins who had migrated to the north of Kerala at the time of Chirakkal Raja may have introduced this dance from Karnataka where a form of Nritham called Darsana Bali was in vogue. Replicas are made of bamboo with which a beautiful frame with intricate designs is created.  The priestly dancer, clad in the traditional style after performing the usual rituals, comes out of the sanctorum, and standing under the flag, holds aloft the replica weighing about 10 kg on his head and starts the divine dance.  The dance begins with Kotti Urayikkal (drumming to make the dancer possessed).  The drumming in different Thaalams accompanied by scintillating music coaxes the performer to dance to each rhythm, creating a holy atmosphere.  Each circumlocution is regulated by a different Thaalam.

Churika Kettu (anointing the hereditary trustee)
It is an ascension ritual. During this, the eldest male member of each of the nine matrilineal Ooralar family on becoming the Ooralan ascends to his respective family post in the temple. It is performed only once in the lifetime of an Ooralan and is the ceremony that officially makes him one. The ceremony requires the acceptance of the Ooralan as legitimate by member of the Kottayam Royal family. Only after the churikakettu, shall such a kaaranavar (eldest male)  be allowed to participate in the temple customs and practices in the capacity of an ooralan. The eldest member along the matrilineal line  is identified and receives the title of  Family name + achan  from a prince of the part-dominion (Koor-vazcha Thampuran). It is being taken from the Royal family of Kottayam (Malabar). Towards this, initially  a delegation of Kaaranavrs and Komaram (Oracle, usually dressed in red and carrying a sword and a large brass anklet)  represent the matter of succession of  the tharavad (matrilineal line)  to the Kottayam Raja who in turn bestows upon the supplicant the title of  achan of the respective tharavadu  after a perusal of his credential as the senior most male member within the tharavadu. Churika kettu is not only a symbolic anointing ceremony to ascert to the members of family but also to the naattukootam (assembly of people) of the anointing of an ooralan.

Vilakkil-enna (oil from the sacred lamps)
 Vilakkil-enna (oil taken from the lamp within the sanctum sanctorum) is offered to devotees till noon as prasadam (blessed consumable). As per legend Sree Hanuman suffered a fall during his boyhood while attempting to approach  Surya (sun). Consequently, Sree Hanuman suffered from a facial injury which the Vayu deva (Lord of air) cured with the help of vilakkil-enna provided by  Sree daivathar (who is also Vaidyanatha/divine physician) resident at Oorpazhachi kavu. Thus vilakkil-enna has become the oushada prasadam (blessed consumable thought to have curative benefits) at Oorpazhachi kavu.

Eduthu oppikkal (request for specific cure/protection.. an offering of surrender )
The thondachan shrine is also where devotees can offer silver icons of body parts requesting for cure or protection of that respective anatomical part. This is usually mediated by vellattom and the ooralar. The devotee places the icon with the ooralan who then transfers the same to the vellattom who then requests for the protection. It is also  a symbol of complete surrender unto the divinity offering each parts of the human body.
The total surrender of the body ego unto the deity with the head bowed with folded hands, in front of the vellattom  ritual symbolizes the self-realization, the blossoming of the divine lotus in oneself in a rare ritual performed at this temple daily at 1200noon .

Thazhe kottam (lower citadel)
Thazhe kottam (lower Citadel) is considered to be the holy groves where shaiva bhootha ganas (companions of shiva), Dharma Devatha and Gulikeswara are worshipped. Their original deva sthana (sacred residence) was at Eduppidikkeri (one of ancestral sites of the ooralar families) from where their deva chaitanya (sacred spirits) were carried to thazhekottam. The family at Thazhppulukkiyil is overseeing the maintenance of this kottam (Citadel). However, as the land of  Eduppidikkeri has the sthira rashi (resident presence) these spirits are always present in Eduppidikkeri as well.

Naagasthanam (Sacred groves of the serpents)
On the South West direction of the temple, at kanni moola,  is the  Naagasthanam (Sacred grooves of the snakes). South West is one of “the most important” direction as per vastu shastra. The ruling planet of this corner is Rahu. Nagaprathishta (consecrated idols of snake gods) and daily naga bali  (daily offerings) adds to the importance of  this kannimoola to the temple structure and its rituals.

It should also be noted that OORPAZHACHI KAVU is one of the rarest temples where NITYA BALI is offered at Nagasthanas. Kannimoola is also known as the Nruthi kon .

Unlike other seven directions where the Devathas rule it, Niruthi kon is ruled by asura Niruthi  who is considered to be an in tempered asura ( kshipra kopi). It adds to a benign belief then that OORPAZACHI has its strongest guardian of asura combination on its  kannimoola with the serpents !

Navarathri Pooja (worship on the 9 holy nights)
Importance of Grantham Vekkal ( worship of books/treatises of knowledge)
Saraswati Pooja (worship of the goddess of knowledge)

Sthalamaahatmya of Oorpazhachikavu (Glory of sacred landmarks in and around the temple precincts)
Importance of Eachil ( a herb) at Mele kottam (upper citadel)
The  Arayal (Ficus religiosa) : one near the mele kuttippadi (entrance barrier); two near the aarattu thara ( citadel of procession); one in front of the temple.
The different species of trees belonging to the genus ficus ( Malayalam names : Athi, Ithi, Aal, Peral),   ponchembakam (Magnolia champaca), chandanam (Santalum album) and other oushadha sasyangal (herbal plants) in and around kaavil thazhe (lower temple precincts), and mele kuttippadi (entrance barrier) and nagasthaanam (sacred grove of the serpent gods).
Maalikaparamba (originally known as  kaalika paramba or the ground of the Goddess Kali) and Karimbappara (black rock)
Mele kulam (upper pond) and Thazhe kulam (lower pond)
Gosai kinar  (well) near the naagasthanam (sacred grove of the serpents)

Naveekarana kalasam (restoration and renovation)
Apart from the normal daily worship rituals for propitiating the deities, there are many esoteric rituals (Taantrika Kriyaas) aiming at increasing the glory and power of the deities and sometimes for atonement for any fading of such power. These restoration and renovation include rituals namely
Dravya Kalasam
Ashtabandha Kalasam  and
Naveekarana Kalasam and are performed as and when prescribed after an astrological investigation.

Mele kottam Naveekaranam and Punahprathishta (Restoration and reconsecration of the idol in the upper citadel)
Nitynidanam nischayikkal (Redetermining the details of daily worship and ceremonial aspects)

See also
 Temples of Kerala
 North Malabar

References

External links

History of Randillam Nambiars
 https://m.youtube.com/watch?v=fQpn73Zy7AQ&feature=youtu.be
edakkadnambiars.net

Hindu temples in Kannur district